Excitement is a 1924 American silent comedy film directed by Robert F. Hill and starring Laura La Plante. It was produced and distributed by Universal Pictures.

Plot
As described in a film magazine review, Nila Lyons, pretty and mischievous, is a worry to her parents, who want her to get married. She leaves home declaring that she will choose a spouse. After going through varied adventures, she marries a young chap who kisses and wins her when their motorcycle dashes into a lake. They agree to separate for a month each year. After Nila has passed through a number of exciting experiences, she settles down with her husband.

Cast

Preservation
With no copies of Excitement found in any film archives, it is a lost film.

References

External links

1924 films
American silent feature films
Lost American films
Films directed by Robert F. Hill
Universal Pictures films
American black-and-white films
Silent American comedy films
1924 comedy films
1924 lost films
Lost comedy films
1920s American films